Nationality words link to articles with information on the nation's poetry or literature (for instance, Irish or France).

Events

Works published in English

United Kingdom
 Robert Browning, Dramatic Lyrics, including "My Last Duchess", "The Pied Piper of Hamelin" and "Soliloquy of the Spanish Cloister"; the author's first collection of shorter poems (reprinted, with some revisions and omissions in Poems 1849; see also Bells and Pomegranates 1841, reprinted each year from 1843–1846)
 Thomas Campbell, The Pilgrim of Glencoe, with Other Poems
 Frederick William Faber, The Styrian Lake, and Other Poems
 J. O. Halliwell-Phillipps, The Nursery Rhymes of England, anthology
 Leigh Hunt, The Palfrey
 Thomas Babington Macaulay, Lays of Ancient Rome, including "Horatius"
 Robert Montgomery, Luther
 Alfred Tennyson, Poems, including "Locksley Hall", "Morte d'Arthur", "Ulysses", "Lady Clara Vere de Vere", "The Two Voices", "The Vision of Sin", "Godiva" and "The Lady of Shalott" (2nd version) (published May 14 in two volumes, with reprinted poems in Volume 1, and new poems in Volume 2)
 William Wordsworth, Poems, Chiefly of Early and Late Years, includes The Bordereers

United States
 Charles Timothy Brooks, translator, Songs and Ballads, translations of German poems
 William Cullen Bryant, The Fountain and Other Poems, a collection of parts of a larger work, never to be completed; published in response to many requests for a longer, more ambitious work of poetry
 Ralph Waldo Emerson, "Saadi"
 Charles Fenno Hoffman, The Vigil of Faith and Other Poems, a popular book with four editions in three years
 Henry Wadsworth Longfellow:
 Poems on Slavery, written in support of the abolitionist movement, dedicated to William Ellery Channing; the author donates the contents of the book to the New England Anti-Slavery Tract Society to republish and distribute
 Ballads and Other Poems, including "The Wreck of the Hesperus"
 Alfred Billings Street, The Burning of Schenectady, and Other Poems, descriptive verses
 Rufus Wilmot Griswold, editor:
 The Poets and Poetry of America, popular anthology that went into several reprints; with poems from over 80 authors, including Henry Wadsworth Longfellow, William Cullen Bryant, Lydia Sigourney (17 poems), Edgar Allan Poe (three poems), and Charles Fenno Hoffman (45 poems), a friend of Griswold's The collection was dedicated to Washington Allston. Philadelphia: Carey & Hart
 Gems from American Female Poets, anthology

Works published in other languages
 Théodore de Banville, Les Cariatides, France
 Sándor Petőfi (originally as Sándor Petrovics), "A borozó" (The Wine Drinker), Hungary
 Giovanni Antonio Vassallo, Il-Ġifen Tork ("The Turkish Caravel"), Malta
 Henrik Wergeland, Jøden ("The Jew"), Norway

Births
Death years link to the corresponding "[year] in poetry" article:
 January 26 - François Coppée (died 1908), French writer, le poète des humbles
 February 3 - Sidney Lanier (died 1881), American
 February 4 - Arrigo Boito (died 1918), Italian
 February 25 - Karl May (died 1912), German writer, principally of adventure novels
 March 18 - Stéphane Mallarmé (died 1898), French
 June 24 - Ambrose Bierce (died c.1914), American poet and writer
 July 11 - Henry Abbey (died 1911), American poet, best known for his poem "What Do We Plant When We Plant A Tree?"
 July 17 - William John Courthope (died 1917), English poet and historian of poetry
 August 14 - Henry Duff Traill (died 1900), English literary journalist
 October 1 - Charles Cros (died 1888), French poet and inventor
 Date not known - John Arthur Phillips (died 1907), English-born Canadian

Deaths
Birth years link to the corresponding "[year] in poetry" article:
 May 23 – José de Espronceda (born 1808), Spanish
 June 12 – Thomas Arnold (born 1795), English, educator, historian and poet
 July 28 – Clemens Brentano (born 1778), German Romantic poet and novelist
 October 30 – Allan Cunningham (born 1784), Scottish poet and author
 December 9 – Samuel Woodworth (born 1785), American author, literary journalist, playwright, librettist and poet
 Date not known - Macdonald Clarke (born 1798), American "Mad Poet"

See also

 19th century in poetry
 19th century in literature
 List of years in poetry
 List of years in literature
 Victorian literature
 French literature of the 19th century
 Biedermeier era of German literature
 Golden Age of Russian Poetry (1800–1850)
 Young Germany (Junges Deutschland) a loose group of German writers from about 1830 to 1850
 List of poets
 Poetry
 List of poetry awards

Notes

19th-century poetry

Poetry